The East Kimberley Regional Airport , locally known as the Kununurra Airport, is an airport in Kununurra, Western Australia. Heavy wet seasons often result in this area being cut off from essential outside services and deliveries. The airport is a crucial piece of infrastructure which enables people and goods to enter or leave from the region and especially supports tourism and economic development.

In 2012, a major expansion of the airport was completed and opened to the public. Costing about AUD$8.68 million, it effectively doubled the size of the facility. This now includes a dedicated arrivals hall with baggage carousel, enlarged check-in area and improved security for the enlarged departure lounge.

Airlines and destinations

Charter airlines 
 Aviair
 Helispirit
 Kimberley Air Tours
 Shoal Air

Due to the long distances involved in traveling across the Kimberley region, several air-tours are offered by various charter airlines not based in Kununurra, hopping across the north-west of Australia. Occasionally connecting some major eastern Australian cities directly with Kununurra and with some bus tour companies too, to avoid lengthy transfers in Darwin or Perth.

Statistics 
Kununurra Airport was ranked 47th in Australia for the number of revenue passengers served in financial year 2010–2011.

New terminal

Old terminal

See also 
 List of airports in Western Australia
 Aviation transport in Australia

References

External links 

 Airservices Aerodromes & Procedure Charts

Kimberley airports
Kununurra, Western Australia